Oriental Orthodoxy in North America represents adherents, religious communities, institutions and organizations of Oriental Orthodox Christianity in North America, including the United States, Canada, Mexico and other North American states. Oriental Orthodox Christians in North America are traditionally organized in accordance with their patrimonial ecclesiastical jurisdictions, with each community having its own structure of dioceses and parishes. Most Oriental Orthodox Christians in North America belong to Armenian, Coptic, Ethiopian, Eritrean, Indian, Syriac and some other communities, representing religious majority or minority within a particular community. Oriental Orthodox jurisdictions are organized within the Standing Conference of Oriental Orthodox Churches.

Jurisdictions

Historically, Oriental Orthodoxy was introduced to North America during the 19th century, mainly through emigration of Christians from the Middle East, Caucasus, North Africa and India. Honoring such diverse heritage, Oriental Orthodoxy in North America is traditionally organized in accordance with patrimonial jurisdictions of autocephalous Oriental Orthodox Churches, each of them having its own hierarchy with dioceses and parishes. Armenian Apostolic Church has two jurisdictions in North America: under the Mother See of Holy Etchmiadzin there are three dioceses, two in the United States (eastern and western), and one in Canada; while under the Holy See of Cilicia there are also two dioceses in the United States (eastern and western), and one in Canada (see: Armenian (Cilician) Diocese of Canada). Coptic Orthodox Church in North America also has several dioceses. Syriac Orthodox Church in North America has its own hierarchy, with two dioceses in the United States (eastern and western), two patriarchal vicariates (one for Canada and one for Central America), and also adding to that the autonomous Malankara Archdiocese of North America. Also, there are dioceses of the Malankara Orthodox Syrian Church in North America, including Malankara Orthodox Diocese of Northeast America (for eastern regions of the United States and eastern regions of Canada), and Malankara Orthodox Diocese of Southwest America (for western regions of the United States and western regions of Canada). Ethiopian Orthodox Church and Eritrean Orthodox Church also have their jurisdictions in North America.

See also

References

Sources

External links
 Standing Conference of Oriental Orthodox Churches (official pages)
 Council of the Oriental Orthodox Churches of the Western USA (2007)
 Meeting of the Oriental Orthodox Churches Council in Western USA (2016)
 Coptic Churches in the United States and Canada
 World Council of Churches: Oriental Orthodox Churches
 OCP (2017): Eastern Orthodox and Oriental Orthodox Prelates Convene Joint Prayer Service Interceding for Migrants and Refugees
 Oriental Orthodox in the USA - Union Between Christians